Cuckoo, Mr. Edgar! is a Canadian animated short film, directed by Pierre M. Trudeau and released in 1999. The film centres on Mr. Edgar, a mechanical bird in a cuckoo clock left inside an abandoned house, who is forced to adapt to the demands of fatherhood when a storm causes three eggs to tumble into the house's living room which soon hatch into baby birds.

The film received a Genie Award nomination for Best Animated Short Film at the 21st Genie Awards, and a Jutra Award nomination for Best Animated Short Film at the 2nd Jutra Awards.

References

External links

1999 films
Canadian animated short films
National Film Board of Canada animated short films
Quebec films
1990s Canadian films